Alexander Borisovich Roshal (in Moscow – ) was a Soviet chess player and journalist, the co-founder and editor of the magazine 64.

References

Soviet chess writers
Soviet male writers
20th-century male writers
Russian sports journalists
1936 births
2007 deaths
20th-century chess players